Prochoreutis sachalinensis is a moth in the family Choreutidae. It was described by Aleksandr Sergeievich Danilevsky in 1969. It is found on Sakhalin Island and in the Russian Far East and Hunan, China.

References

Prochoreutis
Moths described in 1969